Zavodovski Island is an uninhabited volcanic island in the Traversay Islands subgroup of the South Sandwich Islands. It is the northernmost of the South Sandwich Islands and the nearest to South Georgia.

The island is home to around a million pairs of breeding chinstrap penguins, which is the largest number of penguins found anywhere besides Antarctica.

History
Zavodovski Island was discovered and named by Russian Antarctic explorer Fabian Gottlieb von Bellingshausen on December 23, 1819. Bellingshausen named it after Captain-Lieutenant , who was captain of his ship, the Imperial Russian Navy sloop-of-war Vostok. A group of three members of the expedition, Captain-Lieutenant Ivan Zavadovskiy, astronomer Prof. Ivan Simonov, and Lieutenant Dmitriy Demidov, landed on the island on December 24, 1820 and collected specimens of volcanic rocks, and caught some birds and penguins.

The American schooner Pacific under Captain James Brown landed at Zavodovski Island in 1830. The island was surveyed in 1930 by Discovery Investigations (DI) personnel.

The island's penguin colony was featured in the "Frozen Seas" episode of the 2001 BBC nature documentary series The Blue Planet. It was subsequently featured in the "Islands" episode of the 2016 follow-up documentary Planet Earth II.

A volcanic eruption was identified on the island on 2 May 2012, though the size of the eruption is unknown. The volcano erupted again in March 2016; by July, between one third and one half of the island was covered in ash, putting the penguin colonies at risk.

Geography

The island is largely unglaciated.

Many of the island's headlands have been charted and named, generally in recognition of the island's odorous volcanic fumes. Unless noted otherwise, the following names were applied by the United Kingdom Antarctic Place-Names Committee (UK-APC). Low-lying Reek Point is the island's northernmost point. Pacific Point is a small rounded point on the island's northwest side. It was initially named Low Point by DI personnel, but was renamed for the Pacific in 1953 by UK-APC to avoid redundancy with other similarly named features. Low-lying Acrid Point is found to the southwest.

Stench Point is a conspicuous point forming the west extremity of the island. Originally named West Bluff in by DI personnel, it was renamed in 1971 by UK-APC to avoid duplication. Fume Point is a low-lying lava feature forming the island's southern point. Pungent Point, a low, dark-colored lava cliff, forms the island's east point.

Mount Asphyxia, a stratovolcano also known as Mount Curry, dominates the western side of the island while the eastern half is a low-lying lava plain. It is an active volcano, with fresh lava reported in 1830 and numerous indications of activity since. Approximately 50% of the island is composed of tephra, a fragmental material produced by volcanic eruptions.

See also 
 List of Antarctic and sub-Antarctic islands
 List of volcanoes in South Sandwich Islands

Notes

References

Further reading

Zavodovski, South Sandwich Islands with images 

Islands of the South Sandwich Islands
Volcanoes of the Atlantic Ocean
Volcanoes of South Georgia and the South Sandwich Islands
Uninhabited islands of South Georgia and the South Sandwich Islands